Leucogyrophana pseudomollusca is a fungus of the genus Leucogyrophana and family Hygrophoropsidaceae. It was originally described by Estonian mycologist Erast Parmasto in 1962 as a species of Merulius. He transferred it to Leucogyrophana in 1967.

References

Hygrophoropsidaceae
Fungi described in 1962